Samuel Joaquín Flores (born on February 14, 1937, died December 8, 2014) was a Mexican religious leader and a representative of the La Luz del Mundo church.

Biography 
Samuel Joaquín was born on February 14, 1937, the youngest of eight siblings. He became the leader of La Luz del Mundo by the age of 27 after the death of his father. He continued his father's desire for international expansion by traveling outside of Mexico extensively. He was minister of the church until age 27 in Tepic, Nayarit, until after the death of his father, on June 9, 1964. He then became the top leader of the religious group. On May 17, 1962, Flores, who was in charge as head of the church in the Port of Veracruz, married Eva García López, in Guadalajara, with whom he had eight children: Benjamin, Israel, Azael, Rahel, Naasón Merarí, Bathsheba, Uzziel and Atlaí. 

He first visited church members in the Mexican state of Michoacán in August 1964 and later that year went to Los Angeles on a missionary trip. By 1970, the Church had expanded to Costa Rica, Colombia, and Guatemala. Its first small temple in Hermosa Provincia was demolished and replaced by a larger one in 1967. With Samuel Joaquín's work, La Luz del Mundo became integrated into Guadalajara and the Church replicated the model of Hermosa Provincia in many cities in Mexico and abroad. By 1972, there were approximately 72,000 members of the Church, which increased to 1.5 million by 1986 and to 4 million by 1993. Anthropologist Patricia Fortuny says that the Church's growth can be attributed to several factors, including its social benefits, which "improves the living conditions of believers." Samuel Joaquín oversaw the construction of schools, hospitals and other social services. The Church also expanded to countries including the UK, the Netherlands, Switzerland, Ethiopia and Israel between 1990 and 2010. 

Under his administration, the La Luz del Mundo church grew both in Mexico and abroad. In Mexico, it had 188,326 followers according to the INEGI Census in 2010. Joaquín Flores created the Beautiful Province Educational Institutions. In the field of health, he created the Hospital Siloe in Guadalajara, and was involved in various cultural, labor and social projects. By the end of Samuel Joaquín's ministry, La Luz del Mundo was present in fifty countries.

Death 
Samuel Joaquín Flores died on December 8, 2014, at his home in the Hermosa Provincia neighborhood, the world headquarters of La Luz del Mundo in Guadalajara, Jalisco, Mexico, at 77. His funeral was attended by church members from several countries of the world, as well as the Governor of Jalisco, Aristóteles Sandoval, and the municipal president of Guadalajara, Ramiro Hernández.

References 

1937 births
2014 deaths
People from Guadalajara, Jalisco
Mexican religious leaders